In Chile, net neutrality is regulated by the Law Nº 20.453, known as the Chilean net neutrality law. The law was issued on August 18, 2010, becoming the first country in the world to enact a law related to the net neutrality principle.

The law modified the General Law of Telecommunications, adding three articles —24 H, 24 I and 24 J— which establish rights for the Internet users and obligations for Internet service providers. In addition, the law give enforcement powers to the regulator, the Telecommunications Undersecretary (Subsecretaría de Telecomunicaciones, Subtel).

History 
The law was generated in a parliamentary motion dated on March 20, 2007 —Bulletin N° 4915-19— presented by the deputies Gonzalo Arenas, Marcelo Díaz, Enrique Estay, Alejandro García-Huidobro, Patricio Hales, Javier Hernández, Tucapel Jiménez, José Antonio Kast, Carlos Recondo and Felipe Ward. The bill was initially intended to add three articles to the Law Nº 19.496 about consumer protection. However, the articles were finally added to the General Law of Telecommunications, following a report of the Commission on Sciences and Technology of the Chamber of Deputies, and comments by the Telecommunications Undersecretary Pablo Bello and NGOs representatives.

On October 11, 2007 the bill was approved by deputies by 66 votes, 0 votes against and 2 abstentions. On November 11 it was sent to the Senate, and was amended by the Commission on Transports and Telecommunications after hearing telcos representatives, on April 3, 2008. The Senate approved the modified bill on April 30 by 30 votes in favour and one abstention.

In June 2008, the bill received indications by president Michelle Bachelet, and was reviewed by the Commissions on Economy and Transports. Then the bill returned to the Chamber of Deputies, being approved on June 13, 2010, by 99 votes in favour, 0 against and one abstention. The final bill was sent to president Sebastián Piñera who enacted it on August 18, 2010 and was published on August 26.

Overview

References

External links 
 Text of the law
 Internet and Net Neutrality in Subtel.
 Neutralidad.cl
 Neutrality Yes

Chile
2010 in Chile
Internet in Chile
Law of Chile